Daniel Pelosi (born August 2, 1963) is an American man who is the convicted murderer of Wall Street financier Ted Ammon, and is the widower of Generosa Ammon.

Early life 

Pelosi was born in Center Moriches, New York.

Relationship 
Pelosi met Generosa while seeking work as an electrician. Generosa, who was involved in a bitter divorce from Ammon, hired him to supervise the renovation of her townhouse, and they soon began an affair. Pelosi, who was also married, with three children, stayed at Ammon's East Hampton home with Generosa and her two adopted children, and drove Ammon's Porsche Carrera. As Ammon hadn't updated his will to reflect his pending divorce, Generosa inherited the bulk of his $97 million estate after he was found murdered. Pelosi married Generosa on January 15, 2002, one day after his divorce from his wife became final.

Murder and trial 
The Ammon's were days from finalizing their divorce when, on October 22, 2001, he was found bludgeoned to death in his East Hampton, NY weekend home.

While police investigated Ammon's murder, Pelosi was arrested for punching a crew member of a tour boat when the crewman refused to serve Pelosi more alcohol. He was then charged with stealing $43,000 of electricity from the Long Island Power Authority.

Before she died in 2003, Generosa cut Pelosi out of her will. He later challenged the will and a postnuptial agreement which entitled him to $2 million for legal fees. He was arrested for Ammon's murder on March 24, 2004.

Prosecutors theorized that Pelosi killed Ammon to ensure his new-found lifestyle. His former girlfriend testified that he enjoyed killing Ammon. His father testified that Daniel had asked him how to get rid of incriminating evidence. Convicted in December 2004, Pelosi maintains his innocence.

He pleaded guilty to witness tampering in his murder trial in exchange for dropping criminal charges against his first wife Tami and his fiancée; Tami was accused in a separate case of helping Pelosi steal $43,000 in electricity, while his fiancée, bank teller Jennifer Zolnowski, was accused of being his accomplice in the murder.  With no charges pending against Zolnowski, she was able to marry Pelosi, and they wed before he began his prison sentence. She gave birth to their son on August 31, 2004.

As of August 2022, Pelosi is incarcerated under Department Identification Number (DIN)	05A2706 at the Auburn Correctional Facility and will be eligible for parole on October 14, 2031, at the age of 67.

Media coverage 

In 2005, the Lifetime Movie Network released the movie Murder in the Hamptons. The movie is based on the true story of Ted Ammon's death. Pelosi was featured on Dateline NBC in the episode titled "Mystery of the Murdered Millionaire" in 2008.

In 2012, he was featured on an ABC News 20/20 episode titled "Revenge for Real: Murder in the Hamptons".  In May 2012, the Dr. Phil show, episode titled "High Society Whodunit: Murder in the Hamptons", interviews Pelosi behind bars.

References

External links 
 Daniel Pelosi articles from The New York Times
 Murder in East Hampton Vanity Fair January 2002
 Mystery of the Murdered Millionaire Dateline NBC
 The War for Ted Ammon's Children New York Magazine 7 July 2003
 Pelosi back in court -- no crowds, no lawyer Daily News (New York) December 17, 2004. accessdate 17 May 2007

1963 births
Living people
People from Center Moriches, New York
American people convicted of murder
American people of Italian descent
People convicted of murder by New York (state)